Indian Army during World War I order of battle

see Indian Army during World War I for further details  on campaigns and structure

India based formations

North West Frontier
1st (Peshawar) Division
2nd (Rawalpindi) Division
3rd Lahore Divisional Area
4th (Quetta) Division
7th Meerut Divisional Area
16th Indian Division
Bannu Brigade
Derajat Brigade
Kohat Brigade

Southern India
Internal Security and training

5th (Mhow) Division
6th Poona Divisional Area
8th (Lucknow) Division
9th (Secunderabad) Division

Other locations
On internal security or as a guard force

Burma Division
Aden Brigade
South Persia Brigade

Indian Expeditionary Forces

Indian Expeditionary Force A
Western Front

Indian Cavalry Corps
1st Indian Cavalry Division (in 1916 renamed 4th Cavalry Division)
2nd Indian Cavalry Division (in 1916 renamed 5th Cavalry Division)
Indian Corps
3rd (Lahore) Division (redeployed to Mesopotamia in 1915)
7th (Meerut) Division (redeployed to Mesopotamia in 1915)

Indian Expeditionary Force B
East Africa Campaign

27th (Bangalore) Brigade
Imperial Service Infantry Brigade

Indian Expeditionary Force C
East Africa Campaign

29th Punjabis and half battalions from the Princely states of
Jind
Bharatpur
Kapurthala
Rampur
15 pounder artillery battery
10 pounder mountain artillery battery
Maxim gun battery
Field Ambulance

Indian Expeditionary Force D
Mesopotamia Campaign

Cavalry Division
3rd (Lahore) Division
6th (Poona) Division
7th (Meerut) Division
12th Indian Division
14th Indian Division
15th Indian Division
17th Indian Division
18th Indian Division

Indian Expeditionary Force E
Sinai and Palestine Campaign

4th Cavalry Division
5th Cavalry Division
3rd (Lahore) Division
7th (Meerut) Division

Indian Expeditionary Force F
Suez Canal

10th Indian Division
11th Indian Division
22nd (Lucknow) Brigade

Indian Expeditionary Force G
Gallipoli Campaign

29th Brigade

References

Bibliography
 

India in World War I
World War I orders of battle